Mike Lewayne Green (born September 2, 1976) is a former professional American football running back in the National Football League. He was a seventh round selection (213th overall pick) out of the University of Houston by the Tennessee Titans. He played three seasons for the Titans.

References

1976 births
Living people
American football running backs
Barcelona Dragons players
Blinn Buccaneers football players
Houston Cougars football players
Tennessee Titans players
Sportspeople from Ruston, Louisiana
Players of American football from Louisiana
Klein High School alumni